Kumarsen Samarth was an Indian film director. He belonged to a Marathi CKP family. His inclination towards the Marathi language led him to direct some great Marathi/Hindi movies such as Nal Damyanti and Rupaye ki Kahani (1948). His biggest success was the 1955 Marathi film titled Shirdi che Saibaba on the life of the 19th century holyman by the same name. He studied cinematography in Germany and came back to India. He married his distant cousin, Shobhna Samarth, an aspiring actress. They married on the condition that she would be allowed to continue her acting career. They had four children, including the famous film actresses Nutan and Tanuja. He and his wife even made some films together. After fourteen years of marriage, Kumarsen and Shobhana  separated amicably but never divorced. After their separation, Shobhana lived with film actor Motilal. Kumarsen died in his mid-70s.

Personal life 
He was married to actress Shobhana Samarth and had two daughters, Nutan and Tanuja.

Filmography 
Nal Damyanti (1945)
Rupaye ki Kahani (1948)
Shirdi che Saibaba (1955)

References 

Marathi film directors
Year of birth missing
Year of death missing
Hindi-language film directors
20th-century Indian film directors